Vic Stanfield (born 12 May 1951) is a Canadian former professional ice hockey player.

He was a two-time All-American for Boston University, and went on to play eight seasons in the German Bundesliga for the Krefeld Pinguine, becoming the team's all-time leading scorer.

He graduated from Boston University in 1975.

Awards and honors

References

External links

1951 births
Living people
AHCA Division I men's ice hockey All-Americans
Boston University Terriers men's ice hockey players
Canadian ice hockey defencemen
Greensboro Generals (SHL) players
Ice hockey people from Ontario
Kölner Haie players
Krefeld Pinguine players
Roanoke Valley Rebels (SHL) players
Sportspeople from Mississauga